Holophaea caerulea is a moth of the subfamily Arctiinae. It was described by Herbert Druce in 1898. It is found in Ecuador.

References

 

Euchromiina
Moths described in 1898